There have been three baronetcies held by people with the surname Lindsay, one in the Baronetage of Nova Scotia and two in the Baronetage of the United Kingdom. One creation is extant.

The Lindsay Baronetcy, of Evelick in the County of Perth, was created in the Baronetage of Nova Scotia on 15 April 1666 for Alexander Lindsay. The title became extinct on the death of the fifth Baronet in 1799.

The Trotter, later Lindsay Baronetcy, of West Ville in the County of Lincoln, was created in the Baronetage of the United Kingdom on 4 September 1821 for Coutts Trotter, principal partner in Coutt's Bank, with remainder to the male issue of his daughter Anne. She was the wife of Lieutenant-General Sir James Lindsay, son of the Hon. Robert Lindsay, second son of James Lindsay, 5th Earl of Balcarres. Their eldest son, Coutts, succeeded as second Baronet according to the special remainder on his maternal grandfather's death in 1837. He fought in the Crimean War and served as a Deputy Lieutenant and Justice of the Peace for Fife, but is best remembered as an artist and watercolourist. He had two daughters but no sons and the title became extinct on his death in 1913. Robert Loyd-Lindsay, 1st Baron Wantage, was the younger brother of the second Baronet.

The Lindsay Baronetcy, of Dowhill in the County of Kinross, was created in the Baronetage of the United Kingdom on 27 February 1962 for the soldier, explorer and Conservative politician Martin Lindsay. He was a descendant of Sir William Lindsay of Rossie, 1st of Dowhill (b. 1350), uncle of David Lindsay, 1st Earl of Crawford. His great-grandfather Colonel Martin Lindsay commanded the 7th Regiment (The Seaforths) during the Napoleonic Wars and led the bayonet charge which broke through the French defences at the Battle of Merxem.

Lindsay baronets, of Evelick (1666)

Sir Alexander Lindsay, 1st Baronet (died )
Sir Alexander Lindsay, 2nd Baronet (1660–)
Sir Alexander Thomas Lindsay, 3rd Baronet (died 1762)
Sir David Lindsay, 4th Baronet (–1797)
Sir Charles Scott Lindsay, 5th Baronet (died 1799)

Lindsay baronets, of West Ville (1821)
Sir Coutts Trotter, 1st Baronet (1767–1837)
Sir Coutts Lindsay, 2nd Baronet (1824–1913)

Lindsay baronets, of Dowhill (1962)
Sir Martin Alexander Lindsay, 1st Baronet (1905–1981)
Sir Ronald Alexander Lindsay, 2nd Baronet (1933–2004)
Sir James Martin Evelyn Lindsay, 3rd Baronet (born 1968)

See also
Lindsay-Hogg baronets

Notes

References
Kidd, Charles, Williamson, David (editors). Debrett's Peerage and Baronetage (1990 edition). New York: St Martin's Press, 1990, 

Baronetcies in the Baronetage of the United Kingdom
Extinct baronetcies in the Baronetage of Nova Scotia
Extinct baronetcies in the Baronetage of the United Kingdom
Baronetcies created with special remainders
Clan Lindsay
Lindsay family of Evelix
1666 establishments in Nova Scotia